Ryczek is a Polish surname. Notable people with the surname include: 

Dan Ryczek (born 1949), American football player
Ervin J. Ryczek (1909–2006), American politician and funeral director
Paul Ryczek (born 1952), American football player

Polish-language surnames